Saraswati is the Hindu goddess of knowledge, music, art, speech, wisdom, and learning. She is one of the Tridevi, along with the goddesses Lakshmi and Parvati.

The earliest known mention of Saraswati as a goddess is in the Rigveda. She has remained significant as a goddess from the Vedic period through the modern period of Hindu traditions. She is generally shown to have four arms, holding a book, a rosary, a water pot, and a musical instrument called the veena. Each of these items have a symbolic meaning in Hinduism.

Some Hindus celebrate the festival of Vasant Panchami (the fifth day of spring, and also known as Saraswati Puja and Saraswati Jayanti in many regions of India) in her honour, and mark the day by helping young children learn how to write the letters of the alphabet on that day. The goddess is also revered by believers of the Jain religion of west and central India, as well as some Buddhist sects.

Etymology
Saraswati, is a Sanskrit fusion word of saras (सरस्) meaning "pooling water", but also sometimes translated as "speech"; and vati (वती) meaning "she who possesses". Originally associated with the river or rivers known as Saraswati, this combination, therefore, means "she who has ponds, lakes, and pooling water" or occasionally "she who possesses speech". It is also a Sanskrit composite word of surasa-vati (सरसु+अति) which means "one with plenty of water".

The word Saraswati appears both as a reference to a river and as a significant deity in the Rigveda. In initial passages, the word refers to the Sarasvati River and is mentioned as one among several northwestern Indian rivers such as the Drishadvati. Saraswati, then, connotes a river deity. In Book 2, the Rigveda describes Saraswati as the best of mothers, of rivers, of goddesses.
अम्बितमे नदीतमे देवितमे सरस्वति — Rigveda 2.41.16

Best of mothers, the best of rivers, best of goddesses, Sarasvatī.

Saraswati is celebrated as a feminine deity with healing and purifying powers of abundant, flowing waters in Book 10 of the Rigveda, as follows:

अपो अस्मान मातरः शुन्धयन्तु घर्तेन नो घर्तप्वः पुनन्तु |
विश्वं हि रिप्रं परवहन्ति देविरुदिदाभ्यः शुचिरापूत एमि || — Rigveda 10.17

May the waters, the mothers, cleanse us,
may they who purify with butter, purify us with butter,
for these goddesses bear away defilement,
I come up out of them pure and cleansed. — translated by John Muir

In Vedic literature, Saraswati acquires the same significance for early Indians (states John Muir) as that accredited to the river Ganges by their modern descendants. In hymns of Book 10 of Rigveda, she is already declared to be the "possessor of knowledge". Her importance grows in Vedas composed after Rigveda and in Brahmanas, and the word evolves in its meaning from "waters that purify", to "that which purifies", to "vach (speech) that purifies", to "knowledge that purifies", and ultimately into a spiritual concept of a goddess that embodies knowledge, arts, music, melody, muse, language, rhetoric, eloquence, creative work and anything whose flow purifies the essence and self of a person. In Upanishads and Dharma Sastras, Saraswati is invoked to remind the reader to meditate on virtue, virtuous emoluments, the meaning and the very essence of one's activity, one's action.

Saraswati is known by many names in ancient Hindu literature. Some examples of synonyms for Saraswati include Brahmani (power of Brahma), Brahmi (goddess of sciences), Bharadi (goddess of history), Vani and Vachi (both referring to the flow of music/song, melodious speech, eloquent speaking respectively), Varnesvari (goddess of letters), Kavijihvagravasini (one who dwells on the tongue of poets). The Goddess Saraswati is also known as Vidyadatri (Goddess who provides knowledge), Veenavadini (Goddess who plays Veena, the musical instrument held by Goddess Saraswati), Pustakadharini (Goddess who carries a book), Veenapani (Goddess who carries a veena in her hands), Hamsavahini (Goddess who sits on swan) and Vagdevi (Goddess of speech).

Other names include: Ambika, Bharati, Chandrika, Devi, Gomati, Hamsasana, Saudamini, Shvetambara, Subhadra, Vaishnavi, Vasudha, Vidya, Vidyarupa, and Vindhyavasini.

In some interpretations, "Sara" is translated as "Essence", and "Sva" is translated to "Self". Thus, the name Saraswati would translate to "She who helps realize the essence of self" or "She who reconciles the essence (of Parabrahman) with one's self".

Nomenclature 

In the Devanagari script, her name is rendered as Sarasvati. In Telugu, Saraswati is also known as Chaduvula Thalli (చదువుల తల్లి) and Shārada (శారద). In Konkani, she is referred to as Shārada, Veenapani, Pustakadhārini, Vidyadāyini. In Kannada, variants of her name include Sharade, Sharadamba, Vāni, Veenapani in the famous Sringeri temple. In Tamil, she is also known as Kalaimagal (கலைமகள்), Nāmagal (நாமகள்), Kalaivāni (கலைவாணி), Vāni (வாணி) and Bharathi (பாரதி). In the Tiruvalluva Maalai, a collection of fifty-five Tamil verses praising the Kural literature and its author Valluvar, she is referred to as Nāmagal and is believed to have composed the second verse. She is also addressed as Sāradā (the one who offers sāra or the essence), Shāradā (the one who loves the autumn season), Veenā-pustaka-dhārini (the one holding books and a Veena), Vāgdevi, Vāgishvari (both meaning "goddess of speech"), Vāni (speech), Varadhanāyaki (the one bestowing boons), Sāvitri (consort of Brahma), and Gāyatri (mother of Vedas).

In India, she is locally spelled as সৰস্বতী in Assamese, সরস্বতী in Bengali, സരസ്വതി in Malayalam, சரஸ்வதி in Tamil, and ସରସ୍ଵତୀ in Odia.

Literature

Vedas 
Saraswati finds a significant number of mentions in the Rigveda, with a number of tributes offered to her:

Brahmanda Purana 
The birth of Saraswati from the mind of Brahma is described in the Brahmanda Purana:

Bhagavata Purana 
A legend in the Bhagavata Purana describes Saraswati as originally being one of the three wives of Vishnu, along with Lakshmi and Ganga. In the midst of a conversation, Saraswati observed that Ganga playfully kept glancing at Vishnu, behind Lakshmi and her back. Frustrated, Saraswati launched a furious tirade against Ganga, accusing her of stealing Vishnu's love away from her. When Ganga appealed to her husband to help her, he opted to remain neutral, not wishing to participate in a quarrel between his three wives, whom he loved equally. When Lakshmi attempted to soothe Saraswati's anger by reasoning with her, the jealous goddess grew angry with her as well, accusing her of disloyalty towards her. She cursed Lakshmi to be born as the Tulasi plant upon the earth. Ganga, now enraged that Lakshmi had been cursed because she had defended her, cursed Saraswati that she would be incarnated as a river on earth. Saraswati issued the same curse against Ganga, informing her that sinful men would cleanse themselves of their sins with her water. As a result, Vishnu proclaimed that one part of Saraswati would remain with him, that another would exist as a river on earth, and that another would later became the spouse of Brahma.

Matsya Purana 
The Matsya Purana describes the story of Saraswati becoming the consort of Brahma. It states that the creator deity had fallen in love with the woman who had emerged from his own mind. Noticing his amorous glances, she turned to the right side of the deity. The deity produced a new face towards his right. When she appeared on his other two sides, two new faces emerged on these directions. In a last resort, she leapt into the sky. A fifth face emerged from Brahma, looking upwards. Conceding her defeat, she consented to become the deity's consort.

Ramayana 
When Ravana, along with his brothers, Vibhishana and Kumbhakarna, performed a penance in order to propitiate Brahma, the creator deity offered each a boon. The devas pleaded with Brahma to not grant Kumbhakarna his boon. Brahma called upon his consort Saraswati, and instructed her to utter that which the devas desired. She acquiesced, and when the rakshasa spoke to invoke his boon, she entered his mouth, causing him to say, "To sleep for innumerable years, O Lord of Lords, this is my desire!". She then left his form, causing him to reflect upon his misfortune.

History 

In Hindu tradition, Saraswati has retained her significance as a goddess from the Vedic age up to the present day. In the Shanti Parva of the Hindu epic Mahabharata, Saraswati is called the mother of the Vedas, and later as the celestial creative symphony who appeared when Brahma created the universe. In Book 2 of Taittiriya Brahmana, she is called “the mother of eloquent speech and melodious music”. Saraswati is the active energy and power of Brahma. She is also mentioned in many minor Sanskrit publications such as Sarada Tilaka of 8th century CE as follows, 
May the goddess of speech enable us to attain all possible eloquence,
she who wears on her locks a young moon,
who shines with exquisite lustre,
who sits reclined on a white lotus,
and from the crimson cusp of whose hands pours,
radiance on the implements of writing, and books produced by her favour. – On Saraswati, Sarada Tilaka

Saraswati became a prominent deity in Buddhist iconography – the consort of Manjushri in 1st millennium CE. In some instances such as in the Sadhanamala of Buddhist pantheon, she has been symbolically represented similar to regional Hindu iconography, but unlike the more well-known depictions of Saraswati.

Symbolism and iconography 

The goddess Saraswati is often depicted as a beautiful woman dressed in pure white, often seated on a white lotus, which symbolizes light, knowledge and truth. She not only embodies knowledge but also the experience of the highest reality. Her iconography is typically in white themes from dress to flowers to swan – the colour symbolizing Sattwa Guna or purity, discrimination for true knowledge, insight and wisdom.
 
Her dhyana mantra describes her to be as white as the moon, clad in a white dress, bedecked in white ornaments, radiating with beauty, holding a book and a pen in her hands (the book represents knowledge).

She is generally shown to have four arms, but sometimes just two. When shown with four hands, those hands symbolically mirror her husband Brahma's four heads, representing manas (mind, sense), buddhi (intellect, reasoning), citta (imagination, creativity), and ahamkāra (self consciousness, ego). Brahma represents the abstract, while she represents action and reality.

The four hands hold items with symbolic meaning – a pustaka (book or script), a mālā (rosary, garland), a water pot and a musical instrument (vīnā). The book she holds symbolizes the Vedas representing the universal, divine, eternal, and true knowledge as well as all forms of learning. A mālā of crystals, representing the power of meditation, inner reflection, and spirituality. A pot of water represents the purifying power to separate right from wrong, the clean from the unclean, and essence from the inessential. In some texts, the pot of water is symbolism for soma – the drink that liberates and leads to knowledge. The most famous feature on Saraswati is a musical instrument called a veena, represents all creative arts and sciences, and her holding it symbolizes expressing knowledge that creates harmony. Saraswati is also associated with anurāga, the love for and rhythm of music, which represents all emotions and feelings expressed in speech or music.

A hamsa – either a swan or a goose – is often shown near her feet. In Hindu mythology, the hamsa is a sacred bird, which if offered a mixture of milk and water, is said to be able to drink the milk alone. It thus symbolizes the ability to discriminate between good and evil, essence from the outward show, and the eternal from the evanescent. Due to her association with the swan, Saraswati is also referred to as Hamsavāhini, which means “she who has a hamsa as her vehicle”. The swan is also a symbolism for spiritual perfection, transcendence and moksha.

Sometimes a citramekhala (also called mayura, peacock) is shown beside the goddess. The peacock symbolizes colorful splendor, the celebration of dance, and – as the devourer of snakes – the alchemical ability to transmute the serpent poison of self into the radiant plumage of enlightenment.

As a river 
In early texts like the Rigveda, Saraswati was a river goddess and the personification of the Sarasvati river. As a river goddess, she represented fertility and purity. There are three hymns in the Rigveda which are dedicated to the Sarasvati River. A Rigvedic prayer also describes her as 'the best of mothers, of rivers and of goddesses'.

The story of Saraswati becoming a river is mentioned in the Srishti Khanda of Padma Purana as well as in Skanda Purana. In the Skanda Purana, after the events of the Tarakamaya War, the devas deposited their arsenal of weapons at the hermitage of Dadhichi. When they sought the return of these weapons, the sage informed them that he had imbibed all of their power with his penance, and offered his own bones instead, which could serve as the source of new weapons. Despite the objections of the deities, the sage sacrificed himself, and his bones were employed in the manufacture of new arms by Vishvakarma. The sage's son, Pippalada, upon hearing these events, sought to wreak his vengeance on the devas by performing a penance. A mare emerged from his right thigh, which in turn gave birth to a fiery man, Vadava, who threatened to be the doom of all of creation.

Vishnu convinced Vadava that his best course of action would be to swallow the devas one by one, and that he should begin by consuming the primordial water of creation, which was the foremost of both the devas and the asuras. Vadava wished to be accompanied to the source of these waters by a virgin, and so Saraswati was dispatched for his purpose, despite her reluctance. She took him to Varuna, the god of the ocean, who then consumed the being. For good measure, Saraswati transformed into a divine river, flowing with five channels into the sea, making the waters sacred.

In the Padma Purana, it is stated that there was a terrible battle between the Bhargavas (a group of Brahmanas) and the Hehayas (a group of Kshatriyas). From this, an all-consuming fire called Vadavagni was born, which threatened to destroy the whole world. In some versions, a sage named Auva created it. Indra, Vishnu, and the devas visited Saraswati, requesting her to deposit the fire in the western ocean, in order to protect the universe.

Saraswati told Vishnu that she would only agree to assist them if her consort, Brahma, told her to do so. Brahma ordered her to deposit the Vadavagni in the western ocean. Saraswati agreed, and accompanied by Ganga, she left Brahmaloka, and arrived at Sage Uttanka's ashrama. There, she met Shiva, who had decided to carry Ganga. He gave the Vadavagni in a pot to Saraswati, and told her to originate from the plaksha tree. Saraswati merged with the tree, and transformed into a river. From there, she flowed towards Pushkara. Saraswati continued her journey towards the ocean, and stopped once at Pushkarini, where she redeemed humans from their sins. At last, she reached the end of her journey, and immersed the fire into the ocean.

Manifestations

Avatars 
There are many avatars and forms of Goddess Saraswati.

She is venerated as Mahasaraswati in the Kashmir Shakti Peetha, as Vidhya Saraswati in Basara and Vargal, and as Sharadamba in Sringeri. In some regions, she is known by her twin identities, Savitri and Gayatri.

In Shaktism, she takes her Matrika (mother goddess) avatar as Brahmani. Saraswati is not just the goddess of knowledge and wisdom, but also the Brahmavidya herself, the goddess of the wisdom of ultimate truth. Her Mahavidya forms are Matangi and Tara. As Mahavidya, she manifests as:
Mahakali, the is the destroyer of ignorance and ego, and the darkness that surrounds the mind of the unlearned and lethargic
Parvati, the Brahmavidya, the ultimate truth
Lakshmi, she is Vidyalakshmi, who provides wealth according to skill
Vidhya, she is the formless concept of wisdom and knowledge in all of its aspects
Gayatri, she is the personification of the Vedas
Savitri, She is the personification of purity, the consort of Brahma

Maha Saraswati 
In some regions of India, such as Vindhya, Odisha, West Bengal and Assam, as well as east Nepal, Saraswati is part of the Devi Mahatmya mythology, in the Tridevi of Mahakali, Mahalakshmi and Mahasaraswati. This is one of many different Hindu legends that attempt to explain how the Hindu trimurti of gods (Brahma, Vishnu and Shiva) and goddesses (Saraswati, Lakshmi and Parvati) came into being. Various Purana texts offer alternate legends for Maha Saraswati.

Maha Saraswati is depicted as eight-armed and is often portrayed holding a Veena whilst sitting on a white lotus flower.

Her dhyāna shloka given at the beginning of the fifth chapter of Devi Mahatmya is:
Wielding in her lotus-hands the bell, trident, ploughshare, conch, pestle, discus, bow, and arrow, her lustre is like that of a moon shining in the autumn sky. She is born from the body of Gauri and is the sustaining base of the three worlds. That Mahasaraswati I worship here who destroyed Sumbha and other asuras.

Mahasaraswati is also part of another legend, the Navshaktis (not to be confused with Navdurgas), or nine forms of Shakti, namely Brahmi, Vaishnavi, Maheshwari, Kaumari, Varahi, Narsimhi, Aindri, Shivdooti, and Chamunda, revered as powerful and dangerous goddesses in eastern India. They have special significance on Navaratri in these regions. All of these are seen ultimately as aspects of a single great Hindu goddess, with Maha Saraswati as one of those nine.

Mahavidya Nila Saraswati 
In Tibet and parts of India, Nilasaraswati is sometimes considered as a form of Mahavidya Tara. Nila Saraswati is not much a different deity from traditional Saraswati, who subsumes her knowledge and creative energy in tantric literature. Though the traditional form of Saraswati is of calm,  compassionate, and peaceful one: Nila Saraswati is the ugra (angry, violent, destructive) manifestation in one school of Hinduism, while the more common Saraswati is the saumya (calm, compassionate, productive) manifestation found in most others. In tantric literature of the former, Nilasaraswati has 100 names. There are separate dhyana shlokas and mantras for her worship in Tantrasara.
She is worshipped in parts of India as an incarnate or incarnation of Goddess Tara but mostly outside India. She is not only worshipped but also been manifested as a form of Goddess Saraswati.

Sharada avatar in Kashmir 

The earliest known shrine dedicated to goddess worship in Kashmir is Sharada Peeth (6th–12th centuries CE), dedicated to the goddess Sharada. It is a ruined Hindu temple and ancient centre of learning located in present-day Azad Kashmir. The goddess Sharada worshipped in Sharada Peeth is a tripartite embodiment of the goddess Shakti: Sharada (goddess of learning), Saraswati (goddess of knowledge), and Vagdevi (goddess of speech, which articulates power). Kashmiri Pandits believe the shrine to be the abode of the goddess. In line with the Kashmiri Pandit belief that springs which are the abode of goddesses should not be looked at directly, the shrine contains a stone slab concealing the spring underneath, which they believe to be the spring in which the goddess Sharada revealed herself to the rishi Shandilya.  It advanced the importance of knowledge and education in Kashmiri Pandit culture, which persisted well after Kashmiri Pandits became a minority group in Kashmir.

As one of the Maha Shakti Peethas, Hindus believe that it represents the spiritual location of the goddess Sati's fallen right hand. Sharada Peeth is one of the three holiest sites of pilgrimage for Kashmiri Pandits, alongside the Martand Sun Temple and the Amarnath Temple.

Jainism 
Saraswati is also revered in Jainism as the goddess of knowledge and is regarded as the source of all learning. She is known as Srutadevata, Sarada, and Vagisvari. Saraswati is depicted in a standing posture with four arms, one holding a text, another holding a rosary and the remaining two holding the Veena. Saraswati is seated on a lotus with the peacock as her vehicle. Saraswati is also regarded as responsible for dissemination of tirthankars sermon. The earliest sculpture of Saraswati in any religious tradition is the Mathura Jain Saraswati from Kankali Tila dating 132 CE.

Worship

Temples 

Ancient Sharada Peeth in Pakistani-administered Kashmir  is one of the oldest surviving temples of Saraswati.
 
There are many temples dedicated to Saraswati around the world. Some notable temples include the Gnana Saraswati Temple in Basar on the banks of the River Godavari, the Wargal Saraswati and Shri Saraswati Kshetramu temples in Medak, Telangana. In Karnataka, one of many Saraswati/Sharada pilgrimage spots is Shringeri Sharadamba Temple. In Ernakulam district of Kerala, there is a famous Saraswati temple in North Paravur, namely, Dakshina Mookambika Temple North Paravur. In Tamil Nadu, Koothanur hosts a Saraswati temple at Koothanur in Tamil Nadu about 25 kilometres from Tiruvarur. In her identity as Brahmani, additional Saraswati temples can be found throughout Gujarat, Himachal Pradesh, Rajasthan, and Uttar Pradesh. Jnaneshwari Peeth in Karki village of coastal Karnataka also houses a temple dedicated to Saraswati, where she is known as Jnaneshwari.

Festivals 

One of the most famous festivals associated with Goddess Saraswati is the Hindu festival of Vasant Panchami. Celebrated on the 5th day in the Hindu calendar month of Magha (month), it is also known as Saraswati Puja and Saraswati Jayanti in India.

Saraswati Puja in South India 
In Kerala and Tamil Nadu, the last three days of the Navaratri festival, i.e., Ashtami, Navami, and Dashami, are celebrated as Saraswati Puja.  The celebrations start with the Puja Vypu (Placing for Worship). It consists of placing the books for puja on the Ashtami day. It may be in one's own house, in the local nursery school run by traditional teachers, or in the local temple. The books are taken out for reading, after worship, only on the morning of the third day (Vijaya Dashami). It is called Puja Eduppu (Taking [from] Puja). On the Vijaya Dashami day, Kerala and Tamil Nadu celebrate the Eḻuthiniruthu or "Initiation of writing" for children, before they are admitted to nursery schools. This is also called Vidyarambham. The child is often ritually taught to write for the first time on rice spread in a plate with their index finger, guided by an elder of the family, or by a teacher.

During the Navaratri festivities, on the seventh day, which coincides with the Moola nakshatra (which is considered to be the goddess' birth star), the goddesses of various temples are decorated and worshipped in the form of Mahasaraswati, in honour of the goddess of knowledge, wisdom, arts, and learning. Students throng these temples in large numbers and receive books, pencils, pens, and other learning equipments as "Devi prasadam". "Aksharabhyasa", the ceremony of initiating a child into the process of learning, is held on a large scale across these temples.

Saraswati Puja in East, and Northeast India

In Assam, Odisha, West Bengal and Tripura, Goddess Saraswati is worshipped on Vasant Panchami, a Hindu festival celebrated every year on the 5th day in the Hindu calendar month of Magha (about February). Hindus celebrate this festival in temples, homes and educational institutes alike.

Saraswati Puja in North, West, and Central India
In Bihar and Jharkhand, Vasant Panchami is commonly known as Saraswati Puja. On this day, Goddess Saraswati is worshipped in schools, colleges, educational institutes as well as in institutes associated with music and dance. Cultural programmes are also organised in schools and institutes on this day. People especially students worship Goddess Saraswati also in pandals (a tent made up of colourful clothes, decorated with lights and other decorative items). In these states, on the occasion of Saraswati Puja, Goddess Saraswati is worshipped in the form of idol, made up of soil. On Saraswati Puja, the idol is worshipped by people and prasad is distributed among the devotees after puja. Prasad mainly consists of boondi (motichoor), pieces of carrot, peas and Indian plum (ber). On the next day or any day depending on religious condition, the idol is immersed in a pond (known as Murti Visarjan or Pratima Visarjan)  after performing a Havana (immolation), with full joy and fun, playing with abir and gulal. After Pratima Visarjan, members involved in the organisation of puja ceremony eat khichdi together.

In Goa, Maharashtra and Karnataka, Saraswati Puja starts with Saraswati Avahan on Maha Saptami and ends on Vijayadashami with Saraswati Udasan or Visarjan.

In 2018, the Haryana government launched and sponsored the annual National Saraswati Mahotsav in its state named after Saraswati.

Outside the Indian subcontinent

Indonesia 
Watugunung, the last day of the pawukon calendar, is devoted to Saraswati, goddess of learning. Although it is devoted to books, reading is not allowed. The fourth day of the year is called Pagerwesi, meaning "iron fence". It commemorates a battle between good and evil.

Saraswati is an important goddess in Balinese Hinduism. She shares the same attributes and iconography as Saraswati in Hindu literature of India – in both places, she is the goddess of knowledge, creative arts, wisdom, language, learning and purity. In Bali, she is celebrated on Saraswati day, one of the main festivals for Hindus in Indonesia. The day marks the close of 210 day year in the Pawukon calendar.

On Saraswati day, people make offerings in the form of flowers in temples and to sacred texts. The day after Saraswati day, is Banyu Pinaruh, a day of cleansing. On this day, Hindus of Bali go to the sea, sacred waterfalls or river spots, offer prayers to Saraswati, and then rinse themselves in that water in the morning. Then they prepare a feast, such as the traditional bebek betutu and nasi kuning, that they share.

The Saraswati Day festival has a long history in Bali. It has become more widespread in Hindu community of Indonesia in recent decades, and it is celebrated with theatre and dance performance.

China 

Veneration of Saraswati migrated from the Indian subcontinent to China with the spread of Buddhism, where she in known as Biàncáitiān (辯才天), meaning "Eloquent Devī", as well as Miàoyīntiān (妙音天), meaning "Devī of Wonderful Sounds". She is commonly enshrined in Chinese Buddhist monasteries as one of the Twenty-Four Devas, a group of protective deities who are regarded as protectors of the Buddhist dharma. Her Chinese iconography is based on her description in the Golden Light Sutra, where she is portrayed as having eight arms, one holding a bow, one holding arrows, one holding a knife, one holding a lance, one holding an axe, one holding a pestle, one holding an iron wheel, and one holding ropes. In another popular Buddhist iconographic form, she is portrayed as sitting down and playing a pipa, a Chinese lute-like instrument.

Japan 

The concept of Saraswati migrated from India, through China to Japan, where she appears as Benzaiten (弁財天). Worship of Benzaiten arrived in Japan during the 6th through 8th centuries. She is often depicted holding a biwa, a traditional Japanese lute musical instrument. She is enshrined on numerous locations throughout Japan such as the Kamakura's Zeniarai Benzaiten Ugafuku Shrine or Nagoya's Kawahara Shrine; the three biggest shrines in Japan in her honour are at the Enoshima Island in Sagami Bay, the Chikubu Island in Lake Biwa, and the Itsukushima Island in Seto Inland Sea.

Cambodia 
Saraswati was honoured with invocations among Hindus of Angkorian Cambodia, suggests a tenth-century and another eleventh-century inscription. She and Brahma are referred to in Cambodian epigraphy from the 7th century onwards, and she is praised by Khmer poets for being the goddess of eloquence, writing, and music. More offerings were made to her than to her husband Brahma. She is also referred to as Vagisvari and Bharati in Yasovarman era Khmer literature.

Thailand 
In ancient Thai literature, Saraswati is the goddess of speech and learning, and consort of Brahma. Over time, Hindu and Buddhist concepts on deities merged in Thailand. Icons of Saraswati with other deities of India are found in old Thai wats. Amulets with Saraswati and a peacock are also found in Thailand.

Myanmar 

In Burma, the Shwezigon Mon Inscription dated to be of 1084 CE, near Bagan, recites the name Saraswati as follows,

"The wisdom of eloquence called Saraswati shall dwell in the mouth of King Sri Tribhuwanadityadhammaraja at all times". – Translated by Than Tun

In Buddhist arts of Myanmar, she is called Thurathadi (or Thayéthadi). Students in Myanmar pray for her blessings before their exams. She is also believed to be, in Mahayana pantheon of Myanmar, the protector of Buddhist scriptures.

Tibet 

In Tibet, she is known as the Goddess of Music, or the Tara of Music, considered the consort of Mañjuśri, Buddha of Wisdom, she is one of the 21 Taras.

Saraswati is the Divine Embodiment & bestower of Enlightened Eloquence & Inspiration, patroness of the arts, sciences, music, language, literature, history, poetry & philosophy, all those engaged in creative endeavours in Tibetan Buddhism. She is considered the peaceful manifestation of Palden Lhamo (Glorious Goddess). In the Gelugpa tradition, Palden Lhamo is known as Magzor Gyalmo (the Queen who Repels Armies) and is a wrathful emanation of Saraswati while being a protector. Saraswati was the yidam (principal personal meditational deity) of 14th century Tibetan monk Je Tsongkhapa. He composed a devotional poem to her. She is believed in the Tibetan tradition to have accompanied him on his travels, as well as regularly engaging in conversations with him.

See also 

 Aban, "the Waters", representing and represented by Aredvi Sura Anahita.
 Anahita – the Old Persian goddess of wisdom
 Arachosia name of which derives from Old Iranian *Harahvatī (Avestan , Old Persian Hara(h)uvati-).
 Athena – the Greek goddess of wisdom and knowledge
 Sága – the Norse goddess of learning and knowledge 
 Brahmi – Shaktidharmic version of Saraswati
 Minerva – the Roman goddess of wisdom and knowledge
 Rhea – the Greek goddess consort of Cronos and mother of the gods and titans.
 Saraswati Puja
 Sarasvati River, a manifestation of the goddess Saraswati.
 Saraswati Vandana Mantra
 Saraswati yoga
 Sharada Peeth
 Tara (Devi)
 Tridevi
 Koothanur Maha Saraswathi Temple

Citations

References

Further reading 

 Sailen Debnath, The Meanings of Hindu Gods, Goddesses and Myths, Rupa & Co., New Delhi.

External links 

 
 
 

Arts goddesses
Hindu goddesses
Buddhist goddesses
Heavenly attendants in Jainism
Knowledge goddesses
Sea and river goddesses
Shaktism
Wisdom goddesses
Consorts of Brahma
Tiruvalluva Maalai contributors
Music and singing goddesses
Taras
Personifications of rivers
Rigvedic deities